Babięta  is a village in the administrative district of Gmina Piecki, within Mrągowo County, Warmian-Masurian Voivodeship, in northern Poland.

Notable residents
 Herbert Abratis (1918–1945), Wehrmacht officer

References

Villages in Mrągowo County